Chen Szu-yu is the name of:

Chen Szu-yu (table tennis) (born 1993), Taiwanese female table tennis player
Chen Szu-yu (badminton) (born 1994), Taiwanese female badminton player